Richard Preston Butler Jr. (born December 3, 1982), better known by his stage name Rico Love, is an American record producer, songwriter, singer, and rapper. He was born in New Orleans, Louisiana, but split his childhood between Milwaukee, Wisconsin and New York City's Harlem neighborhood. He attended Florida A&M and, while visiting Atlanta, Georgia, worked his way into the music industry through connections with Usher, who would become one of Love's frequent collaborators.

The first song Love ever wrote in his career was "Throwback" which ended up on Usher's 2004 album Confessions. Love's success continued writing and producing hit records such as Usher's "There Goes My Baby" and "Hey Daddy (Daddy's Home)", Nelly's "Just a Dream" and "Gone", as well as Beyoncé's "Sweet Dreams". and has contributed to works which have gone on to win Grammys such as Beyoncé's 2009 Best Contemporary R&B album I Am... Sasha Fierce, Usher's 2010 Best Contemporary R&B album Raymond v. Raymond, and Usher's 2010 Best Male R&B Vocal Performance "There Goes My Baby". In addition Love has written and produced records for Kelly Rowland, Diddy – Dirty Money, Chris Brown, Alexandra Burke, Keri Hilson, Fergie, and Fantasia.

As a solo recording artist, Love released two studio albums: TTLO (2015) and Even Kings Die (2018). He is also the CEO of Division1, a record label that partnered with Interscope Records in 2013. He has appeared as a featured artist on records with T.I., Usher, Jermaine Dupri, Jamie Foxx, Rich Boy, and Fat Joe.

Early life 
Love was born in New Orleans, Louisiana, and his parents divorced at an early age. As a result of the divorce Love spent his childhood growing up in two different cities, in Milwaukee, Wisconsin with his mother and Harlem with his father. Love's mother encouraged him as a child to write poetry. Love wrote his own poems and went on to joining the African American Children's Theater where he recited Langston Hughes and acted. Love had already been writing his own poems before he was introduced to rap in his early teens. By the end of high school Love had decided to pursue a career in rap but would go to college simultaneously, "I'm [going] to go to school instead of just sitting on the block. If I hadn't gone to college I would've been a drug dealer."

While in college at Florida A&M University Love stayed involved in his music by winning many rap battles and talent shows. On the weekends Love would leave for Atlanta, Georgia for the benefit of its studios and popular music scene. While visiting Atlanta Love met members of Jagged Edge who were an influence on Love's songwriting development. Love eventually left college because of a paperwork error made by the college's administration's office. Love went to live with some local Atlanta producers the Corna Boyz. This relationship provided Love the opportunity to rap on a remix the producers were creating for Usher. Usher liked Love's work on the remix and eventually signed him to US Records/J Records. Usher requested Love compose lyrics for a song written by Just Blaze. This song eventually became "Throwback" and was featured on Usher's Diamond-selling (10× Platinum) Confessions album. Love next toured with Usher where he met and connected with many music industry players. Usher encouraged Love to become a songwriter and requests for Love's compositions began coming from artists Chris Brown, Omarion, and Marques Houston. Love currently lives in Miami with photographer Robin Thompson known as Robin V. They have two children together, a son, Carys Preston, and a daughter, Believe Beyond.

Music career

Solo artist 
As a solo recording artist, Love is both a singer and a rapper. Love was asked by Usher to contribute to the soundtrack to the film In the Mix. Love contributed "Settle Down", "Sweat" featuring Usher, and "On the Grind" featuring Juelz Santana and Paul Wall. Love recorded a solo album in 2007 titled The 5th Element which he ultimately decided to focus on his songwriting and not release the recordings. Though Love may not be recording as a solo artist he still contributes his vocals and rhymes to other artists. Love has appeared as a guest artist on songs by Fat Joe, Juvenile, Rich Boy, Jamie Foxx, T.I., and his own artist, Young Chris.

After 8-year hiatus from his solo career and signing his label Division 1 to a distribution deal with Interscope Records, Rico Love would release an extended play entitled Discrete Luxury, on February 27, 2014, which would be re-released. It charted on the Top R&B/Hip-Hop Albums at number 48. The first single from the album, "They Don't Know", it debuted and peaked at number 60 on the Billboard Hot 100 making it Rico Love's highest-charting single as a solo artist. The second single from the album, is entitled "Bitches Be Like". On December 9, 2013, Rico Love released a mixtape entitled El Presidente.

On August 27, 2014, Rico Love released a mixtape entitled I Sin. On December 2, 2014, Rico Love would release the lead single from his debut studio album, entitled "Somebody Else".

On February 18, 2015, Rico Love announced he would be releasing his debut studio album, titled Turn The Lights On, on May 19, 2015. On May 5, 2015, Rico Love would release the second single from Turn The Lights On entitled "Days Go By". On May 18, 2015, the album was released with production from, among others, Danja, Benny Blanco, Jim Jonsin and Robopop, along with the major record label Interscope Records.

Rico recently supported singer Monica on 'The Code Red Experience Tour'.

Production/songwriting

Love wrote the song "Throwback" at the request of Usher which was a part of the 2004 triple Grammy-winning album Confessions. Love also wrote "Seduction" which was a bonus track on the Confessions special edition release. These were the first of several collaborations between the singer and the writer/producer.
In September 2007, Rico Love wrote and produced on the Platinum single "Love Like This" by singer Natasha Bedingfield featuring Sean Kingston. This song was popular with mainstream audiences reaching No. 11 on the Billboard Hot 100. The song was also a hit in dance clubs, reaching number one on the Billboard Hot Dance Club Songs chart.

In May 2008, "Energy" was released as the first single by Keri Hilson from her Gold album In a Perfect World.... The song was co-written and co-produced by Love for the Grammy-nominated artist.
The song "Labels or Love", co-written and produced by Love and performed by Fergie was released in May 2008. The song was featured on the deluxe version of her triple Platinum album The Dutchess and also the Gold-selling soundtrack to the film Sex and the City. In November 2008, Beyoncé's double Platinum and 5× Grammy-winning album I Am... Sasha Fierce included four songs featuring Love's songwriting and production. Love wrote and produced on the Platinum single "Sweet Dreams" which reached No. 10 on the Billboard Hot 100. Love's work was also featured on "Scared of Lonely", "Radio", and "Save the Hero".
By the end of 2008 in December, another Love co-written and co-produced track was released as a single for the Grammy-nominated artist Pleasure P. "Boyfriend #2" reached No. 2 on the Billboard Hot R&B/Hip-Hop Songs chart.
Love wrote and produced five songs on Mario's D.N.A. album released in October 2009. The songs included the single "Thinkin' About You" and "Hi", "Ooh Baby", "Soundtrack to My Broken Heart", and "Get Out".

Love wrote and produced on his former mentor Usher's Raymond v. Raymond album, released in March 2010. The Platinum and Grammy-winning album featured four of Love's compositions including two of the album's singles. The Love co-produced and co-written single "There Goes My Baby" was a hit and stayed at number one on the Billboard Hot R&B/Hip-Hop Songs chart for four weeks and earned Usher a Grammy for his performance on the song. The other single featuring Love's writing and producing was "Hey Daddy (Daddy's Home)" which rose to number two on the Billboard Hot R&B/Hip-Hop Songs chart. Love's other contributions to the album included the songs "Making Love (Into the Night)" and "So Many Girls".
At the end of March 2010 the single "Hello Good Morning" penned by Love for Diddy – Dirty Money was released. Diddy is one of Love's mentors in the industry and he was honored to write for the performer/producer/mogul. The song went on to achieve Gold status and was performed by DDM and Rico Love on season nine of American Idol.
Nelly's 5.0 album, released in November 2010 contained eight works featuring Love's songwriting and production skills. The first single, "Just a Dream", co-written and co-produced by Love, went Platinum and landed at number three on the Billboard Hot 100. Love also worked on the single "Gone" featuring Kelly Rowland, a follow-up to the 2002 Nelly hit "Dilemma" also featuring Rowland. Love's other work on the album were on the tracks "Broke", "Making Movies", "Don't It Feel Good", "K.I.S.S.", "Nothing Without Her", and "Move That Body".
Love wrote, produced, and appeared as an artist on Jamie Foxx's Best Night of My Life album released December 2010. The album's first single "Living Better Now" features Rick Ross and was co-written and co-produced by Love. Love wrote "Freak", which also features his appearance as an artist, and "Sex On the Beach".
Love is managed by Made Communication, Miami, Florida.

He has also written and produced for Fergie, Chris Brown, ASAP Rocky, David Guetta, Wiz Khalifa, and Mary J. Blige.

Division 1
In November 2010, Love launched Division 1 which originally partnered with Universal Motown but later moved the venture to Interscope Records. In 2011, Love signed R&B artist Teairra Marí & rap artist Young Chris to his label. In 2013, Love's label venture signed the artist, Tiara Thomas, to its roster. Love also has a production company of the same name to which he signed producers, Earl Hood, Eric Goudy, and D Town. In 2014, Rico Love signed Trina to his label.

Musical influences/techniques 
Love has cited various artists as influences such as Usher (who originally signed Love), Sean "Diddy" Combs, Michael Jackson, Marvin Gaye, R. Kelly, Queen, Smokey Robinson, Elton John, and Miles Davis.

Love has explained when composing he does not write lyrics down or even spend many hours working on songs. He simply listens to a beat and then sings what comes to him. He was quoted as learning this technique from Jagged Edge. Love claims that his technique gives him the ability to write songs very quickly which affords him the opportunity to place more songs on any single album than what most writers could.

Discography 

Studio albums
 The 5th Element (2007) Shelved 
 Turn the Lights On (2015)
Even Kings Die (2018)
Rico Love Presents: Emerging Women of R&B (2020)

EPs
 Discrete Luxury (2013)
 Turn The Lights On (2015)
 
Singles
 "They Don't Know" (2013)
 "Bitches Be Like" (2014
 "Somebody Else" (2015)

Awards and nominations 
2005 Grammy nomination for Album of the Year – Usher – Confessions
2005 Grammy for Best Contemporary R&B Album – Usher – Confessions
2009 Grammy nomination for Album of the Year – Beyoncé – I Am... Sasha Fierce
2010 Billboard No. 9 Hot R&B/Hip-Hop Songwriter of the Year
2010 Billboard No. 6 Hot R&B/Hip-Hop Producer of the Year
2010 Billboard No. 26 Hot R&B/Hip-Hop Publisher of the Year
2010 Sesac Song Awards for Beyoncé's "Sweet Dreams" and Pleasure P's "Boyfriend #2"
2011 Grammy Award for Best Male R&B Vocal Performance - Usher - There Goes My Baby

References

 https://web.archive.org/web/20120503164723/http://www.grammy.com/nominees
 http://www.mtv.com/news/articles/1651341/young-chris-dj-drama-dj-don-cannon-give-philly-reintroduction.jhtml
 http://www.miaminewtimes.com/2010-11-04/music/rico-love-and-usher-at-the-division-1-label-launch-november-5/

External links

 https://web.archive.org/web/20110718204030/http://division1.com/
 https://twitter.com/iamricolove
 https://www.youtube.com/officialdivision1

1982 births
Living people
African-American record producers
African-American male singer-songwriters
Musicians from New Orleans
Rappers from New Orleans
African-American male rappers
People from Harlem
Musicians from Milwaukee
American hip hop singers
Rhythm and blues musicians from New Orleans
American rhythm and blues singer-songwriters
American hip hop record producers
Record producers from Louisiana
Record producers from Wisconsin
Record producers from New York (state)
21st-century African-American male singers
21st-century American rappers
Singer-songwriters from Wisconsin
Singer-songwriters from Louisiana
Singer-songwriters from New York (state)